Gobrecht is a surname. Notable people with the surname include:

Chris Gobrecht (born 1955), American basketball coach
Christian Gobrecht (1785–1844), United States Mint engraver
W. J. Gobrecht (born 1931), American football player and coach

See also
Gobrecht dollar, a United States silver dollar